Thiruvananthapuram Metropolitan Area is the area consisting of Thiruvananthapuram Corporation and the municipalities of Attingal, Nedumangad and Neyyattinkara, 3 "outgrowths" and 24 census towns. The total population is 1,687,406, which includes 815,200 males and 872,206 females as per 2011 census.

Components

Trivandrum Capital Region
The Thiruvananthapuram Capital Region or TCR is the area proposed by TRIDA (Thiruvananthapuram Development Authority) by joining adjacent municipalities of Attingal, Varkala, Neyyattinkara and Nedumangad with Thiruvananthapuram city. This was proposed for planning the development of the capital region of Kerala more effectively. The TCR covers most part of the Thiruvananthapuram UA and eyes to develop the surrounding municipalities as satellite towns to the main city.

References

Cities and towns in Thiruvananthapuram district